Razia Iqbal (born 1962) is a Ugandan journalist employed by BBC News. She is a special correspondent, reporting for outlets across the BBC.  From 2011 Iqbal has also presented Newshour on the BBC World Service.  She has also presented Talking Books on the BBC News Channel.  She was previously the corporation's arts correspondent.

Early life
Iqbal was born into a Punjabi family in Uganda, in 1962.

Education
Iqbal was educated at Garrett Green Comprehensive School in Tooting, South London, followed by the University of East Anglia, from which she graduated with a BA in American Studies in 1985. During her time at UEA she spent a year abroad at Trinity College, Connecticut.

Life and career
Iqbal is a former arts correspondent for BBC News, regularly appearing in news bulletins to report on arts related stories.

She has also hosted the BBCs HARDtalk Extra programme, interviewing prominent figures from the arts including Sting and Jacqueline Wilson.

In 2009, Iqbal applied for the Arts Editor position with BBC News but the role went to Will Gompertz.

Iqbal has reported on mainstream news items for BBC News. One of the first of these was an investigation into a charity scam following the earthquake in Haiti in January 2010.

In mid-2010, Iqbal presented relief shifts on the BBC News Channel, as well as presenting Talking Books on the channel.  From 2011 Iqbal has also been a regular presenter of Newshour on the BBC World Service.

In spring 2022, Iqbal took a sabbatical from the BBC to take up a six month post as a Ferris Visiting Journalism Professor at Princeton University, where she taught a class on journalism with a focus on international news. she presented a range of YouTube discussions during that period on the Russian Invasion of Ukraine.

Awards and nominations
In January 2013, Iqbal was nominated for the Services to Media award at the British Muslim Awards.

Personal life
Iqbal is separated from husband George Arney, a presenter of The World Today.

References

External links
 Razia's Arthouse Blog

1962 births
Women radio journalists
Living people
Alumni of the University of East Anglia
BBC newsreaders and journalists
BBC World Service presenters
British people of Pakistani descent
Princeton University faculty